John Charles Harold Ferdinand Lyon-Dalberg-Acton, 5th Baron Acton (born 19 August 1966), is a British author and peer.

Early life and education
Born in Oxford, he was educated at Winchester College (1980–1983) and Balliol College, Oxford (1984–1989).

Life
He is today an author and farmer living in Gloucestershire, England. He became the 5th Baron Acton and 17th Marquess of Groppoli upon the death of his father in October 2010.

Family
He married Lucinda Percival in 1998.

Book list
 The Sausage Book: The Complete Guide to Making, Cooking and Eating (with Nick Sandler)
 The Branded Cookbook: 85 Recipes for the World's Favorite Food Brands (2009) (with Nick Sandler)
 Soup (with Nick Sandler)
 The Duchy Originals Cookbook (2007) (with Nick Sandler)
 Kings of Comedy: The Slapstick, The Funny Trick, The Master of Mime, The Double Act, The Matter of Fact, and The Classic One-Line (The 21st Century Guides Series) (2006)
 Origin of Everyday Things (2006) (with Tania Adams)
 Minted: The Story of the World's Money (2006)
 The Ideas Companion: Crafty Copyrights, Tricky Trademarks and Peerless Patents (A Think Book) (2006)
 Preserved (2004) (with Nick Sandler)
 The Man Who Touched the Sky (2002)
 Mushroom (2001) (with Nick Sandler)

References

1966 births
John
5
Living people
Eldest sons of British hereditary barons
Alumni of Balliol College, Oxford
People educated at Winchester College